A constitutional referendum was held in South Korea on 17 December 1962. The new constitution was approved by 80.6% of voters, with a turnout of 85.3%.

Results

References

1962 referendums
1962 elections in South Korea
Constitutional referendums in South Korea